The University of the Azores (Portuguese: Universidade dos Açores), or commonly abbreviated as UAc, is the only public university in the Autonomous Region of the Azores. It was founded on January 9, 1976, two years after the Carnation Revolution that ended several decades of dictatorship in Portugal, but before the Portuguese Third Republic was institutionalized, along with the Region's Autonomy. The university is a public institution dependent on the Ministry of Science, Technology and Higher Education and was established in order to advance sustainable development and higher education in the Azores.

History

The establishment of the University of the Azores developed from a period of autonomous politics related to separatist movements that developed in the second half of 1975. Although not completely responsible, the events following the Carnation Revolution provided the conditions necessary for the creation of the university. Due to a level of academic disorder on the continent, that forced the closing of many universities, several of the wealthier families sent their children to the United States or Canada in order for them to complete their studies. It was during this post-revolutionary period that the idea of creating a local institution of higher learning was debated. A small group of academics and elites explored alternatives in order to lower costs, distances and reduce the impact of national government centralization. It was at this time that the central government suggested the creation of a Centro Universitário (University Centre), one that the President of the Regional Junta, General Altino de Magalhães, refused to consider since he felt that the community would only accept the establishment of a formal University.

A working group was established by ministry order 414/75 on 14 October 1976 to debate the issues and provide solutions. On 9 January 1976, Decree 5/76 was promulgated to establish the Instituto Universitário dos Açores (University Institution of the Azores), during an atmosphere of regionalization that fostered the establishment of local/regional institutions responsible for teaching, investigation, cultural development and community services. The intent of the Act was to respond to the process of democratization developing during the post-Carnation Revolution period, and allow the develop of regional equilibrium between the continent and the regional institutions. On 25 July 1980, with the promulgation of the Decree-Law 252/80 formalized the establishment of an institute of higher education, that the community began to refer to as the University of the Azores.

Structure 

In order to effectively provide educational services to regional population, the university established three campuses, in Ponta Delgada (São Miguel), Angra do Heroísmo (Terceira) and Horta (Faial) and organized into departments and schools to, essentially, provide instruction and investigation services. In addition to the Main Campus (Ponta Delgada), which provides a concentration of various disciplines, the other two campuses provided specialized training in agrarian sciences and oceanography;

Since its foundation, the university has had four rectors. Currently, its rector is Dr. Avelino de Freitas de Meneses, a professor of insular history of the Atlantic.

Schools
Escola Superior de Enfermagem de Angra do Heroísmo, (English: Nursing School of Angra do Heroísmo), in Angra do Heroísmo
Escola Superior de Enfermagem de Ponta Delgada, (English: Nursing School of Ponta Delgada), in Ponta Delgada

Departments
Faial
Departamento de Oceanografia e Pescas, (Department of Oceanography and Fisheries) - the only unit located on the island, it was created in 1976, in order to foster "scientific understanding, the conservation of marine life and the sustainable use of the Atlantic Ocean in the region of the Azores", in conjunction with initiatives by the Azorean Department of Fisheries (DOP). Since 1991, DOP/UAç has been a founding member of IMAR (Institute do Mar) and in 1996 joined the network of European Association of Research Stations, EurOcean, the European Network of Excellence on Marine Biodiversity (MarBEF) and European Seas Observatory Network (ESONET). Further, DOP/UAç are participants in steering committees for three great initiatives by Census of Marine Life program: ChEss (Biogeography of Chemosynthetic Ecosystems), MAR-ECO (Patterns and Processes of the Ecosystems of the Mid-Atlantic Ridge) and CenSeam (A Global Census of Marine Life on Seamounts). There is also participation on international initiatives as part of the OTN (Ocean Tracking Network).
São Miguel
Departamento de Biologia, (English: Department of Biology) - located in Ponta Delgada, São Miguel
Departamento de Ciências da Educação, (English: Department of Educational Sciences), in Ponta Delgada
Departamento de Ciências Tecnológicas e Desenvolvimento, (English: Department of Technological Sciences and Development), in Ponta Delgada
Departamento de Economia e Gestão, (English: Department of Economics and Management), in Ponta Delgada
Departamento de Geociências, (English: Department of Geosciences), in Ponta Delgada
Departamento de História, Filosofia e Ciências Sociais, (English: Department of History, Philosophy and Social Sciences), in Ponta Delgada
Departamento de Línguas e Literaturas Modernas, (English: Department of Languages and Modern Literature), in Ponta Delgada
Departamento de Matemática,(English: Department of Mathematics), in Ponta Delgada

Terceira
Departamento de Ciências Agrárias, (English: Department of Agricultural Sciences), in Angra do Heroísmo. The areas of education and research are:
 Agriculture: pastures, horticulture, frutaculutre; soils and fertility; protection of plants; hydrology and water resources; rural engineering; regional economies and natural resources;
 Environment: ecology and conversation; agricultural biology; chemical and physical atmosphere; chemical and water microbiology; climatology; spatial planning; basic sanitation; diagnosis and environmental auditing; environmental impact studies; physical oceanography;
 Biotechnology
 Animal Production: nutrition; alimentation; reproduction and maintenance;
 Food technology: hygiene and food safety; human nutrition; oenology.

Research centers 
 Centro de Biotecnologia dos Açores (CBA) (English: The Biotechnology Centre of Azores)
 Centro de Estudos de Economia Aplicada do Atlântico CEEAplA (English: Centre of Applied Economics Studies of the Atlantic)
 Centro de Física e Investigação Tecnológica Dep. de Física da FCT/UNL (English: The Center for Physical and Technological Research )
 Centro de História de Além-Mar (English: The Centre for Overseas History )
 Centro de Inovação e Sustentabilidade em Engenharia e Construção
 Centro de Investigação e Tecnologia Agrária dos Açores (CITA-A)
 Centro de Vulcanologia e Avaliação de Riscos Geológicos
 Centro de Empreendedorismo da Universidade dos Açores|Centro de Empreendedorismo

Faculty 
 Maria de Fátima Silva de Sequeira Dias, late historian of the Azores, Department of Management and Economics.

See also
List of universities in Portugal
Higher education in Portugal

External links
Campus de Angra/Angra Campus or the Department of Agricultural Sciences (in Portuguese)
Department of Mathematics
Department of Oceanography and Ichthyology in Horta

References
Notes

Sources
 

 
Organisations based in the Azores
Educational institutions established in 1976
1976 establishments in Portugal
Buildings and structures in Ponta Delgada